Agnieszka Lukasiak (born 18 December 1984 in Wrocław, Poland)  is a film director based in Los Angeles, Stockholm and London. She began her career directing cinema-released feature documentaries, and is now directing feature films.

Lukasiak came to Sweden with her parents as refugees.
She graduated from the directing department of the Polish National Film School in Łódź.

Filmography

  Egzorcysta Pan Skowron (1998)
 Murzynek bambo (2000)
 Algeria: Drink, Smoke and Love (2003) ASIN: B004YWSJQ2
 Algeria: The Nameless War (2003)
 Bortglömda (2005) English title: Forgotten Between Two Fires (2011)
 Could this Be You?  (2019)
 Animal Within. (2022)

Awards
In 2006 she won the Nordic Documentary Award for her film Forgotten'' at the Nordisk Panorama Film Festival in Aarhus, Denmark.

Awards and Official Selections
NORDISK PANORAMA, Winner, Best Documentary, 2006
GULDBAGGEN, Nominated, Best Feature, 2011
TRIESTE FF, Italy, Winner, Best Documentary, 2007
GOLDEN CARPATHIAN IFF, Winner Audience Award, 2011
PROWINCJONALIA FF, Winner Critics award, Winner Best female lead, 2010
MLODZI I FILM IFF, Winner young jury award, Winner best script, 2011
IMAGES INTERNATIONAL FF  Harare, Zimbabwe,  Winnaer, Best Documentary, 2006
THE HUMANITARIAN AWARD, 2006, winner,  A prize handled out to a Scandinavian film maker by a special commission each year
ETIUDA, Kraków Short Film Festival, Winner, Best Short Documentary, 1998
EDINBURGH IFF, official selection 2011
IFFI, official selection, 2011
LONDON P film festival, official selection, 2011
PUSAN IFF, official selection 2010
WARSAW IFF, In competition 2011
LUBECK Film Festival, Winner, 2011
MILL VALLEY IFF, official Selection, 2011
FEBIOFEST PRAG, in competition, 2011
DORTMUND Women FF, In competition, 2011
NEW HORIZON IFF, In competition, 2011
TROIA IFF, In competition, 2011
OFF PLUS CAMERA IFF, In competition, 2011
ANKARA IFF, In competition, 2011
MURMANSK IFF, official selection, 2011
HONG KONG IFF, official selection, 2012
Koszalin, In competition, 2011
Kaunas, In competition,2011
Valladolid, In competition, 2011
Cottbus, In competition, 2011
Helsinki Refugee, official selection, 2011
Vienna human rights, official selection, 2011
Gbg, official selection, 2012
Seoul women, official selection, 2012
Palic, official selection, 2012
Munich film festival, Nominated for best documentary, 1999
IDFA documentary film festival Amsterdam, Best Feature film-length documentary, 2002, In competition
Hot Docs Toronto, Canada, Best Feature Length Documentary, 2002, In competition
Silverdocs, USA, Best Feature-length Documentary, 2002, In competition
Gothenburg Film Festival, Best Documentary, 2003, In competition
Kazimierz 03, Best Documentary, 2003, In competition
Chicago film festival, Best Documentary, 2003, In competition
New York film festival, Best Documentary, 2003, In competition
Athens film festival, Best Documentary, 2003, In competition
Ljubljana film festival, Best Documentary, 2003, In competition
Tempo film festival, Best Documentary, 2003, In competition
Margaret Mead Film festival, Best Documentary, 2004, In competition
Thessaloniki Docu film festival, Best Documentary, 2003, In competition
REAL; life on film, Australien, Best Documentary, 2003, In competition
Nordisk Panorama, Best Documentary, 2003, In competition
Full frame Documentary film festival, Best Documentary, 2007, In competition
Sofia international film festival, Best Documentary, 2007, In competition
ZagrebDox, Best Documentary, 2007, In competition
DocsBarcelona-International Film festival, 2007, No competitive festival
Oslo international film festival, 2006
Fox days Helsinki
DokMa, Nordisk film days Lubeck, Best documentary, 2007, In competition
reykjavik shorts&Docs, Best documentary, 2007, In competition
Bucharest Film festival, Best Documentary, 2007, In competition
Munich film festival, Best Short Film, 1999, In competition
Munich film festival, Best Documentary, 1999, In competition
Kraków Film festival, Best Documentary, 1999 In competition

References

External links

Swedish women film directors
1978 births
Living people
Swedish documentary filmmakers
Swedish film directors
Women documentary filmmakers